Roulette russe (Russian roulette) is the second album by French rocker Alain Bashung, issued in 1979 on Philips Records. The album was reissued the following years with a couple of songs dropped and the two songs from his breakthrough single, Gaby oh Gaby, added.

Production 
In 1979, Alain Bashung was 32 and although he began his career in music more than ten years before, he met no success after the commercial failures of his first singles and his first album, Roman-photos (Fotonovelas) which Bashung later disowned. He often said that Roulette russe was a "last-chance album" of sort.

The album has a rather dark mood, with songs dealing with personal matters, like Elsass Blues about his childhood in Alsace ("J'suis né tout seul près d'la frontière, celle qui vous faisait si peur hier" which means "I was born alone near the border, that very border that you feared yesterday"), but the absurd humour that would be his trademark on his albums with lyricist Boris Bergman was already present.

Standouts from the album include Je fume pour oublier que tu bois ("I smoke to forget that you drink") (first single from the album in 1979), Bijou, bijou ("Jewel, jewel") or Toujours sur la ligne blanche ("Still on the white line") which would remain concert staples.

Reception

Commercial performance 
Roulette russe met with little success on his first issue, but after the release of his breakthrough single Gaby oh Gaby the next year, the album would be rereleased to include the song and therefore enjoyed more success.

Critical reception 
In his book La discothèque parfaite de l'odyssée du rock, Gilles Verlant, although he did not include the album in his list of essential albums, qualified the album string of Roulette russe / Pizza as a "triumph".

Track listing 

In 1980, a new version of the album was released after the success of the Gaby oh Gaby single. Milliards de nuits dans le frigo and Les Petits Enfants were both dropped for space, and Gaby oh Gaby and its b-side Elle s'fait rougir toute seule were added, the former becoming the first song on the album and the latter becoming the last.

Singles 
 1979 : Je fume pour oublier que tu bois / Bijou, bijou
 1980 : Gaby oh Gaby / Elle s'fait rougir toute seule (France : 2)

Certifications

References 

1979 albums
Barclay (record label) albums
Alain Bashung albums